The white-headed munia (Lonchura maja) is a species of estrildid finch found in Teladan, Malaysia, Singapore, Thailand and Vietnam. This species is also introduced to Portugal. It is found in wetlands habitat. The status of the species is evaluated as Least Concern.

Taxonomy
The white-headed munia was formally described in 1766 by the Swedish naturalist Carl Linnaeus in the twelfth edition of his Systema Naturae under the binomial name Loxia maja. Linnaeus cited George Edwards's "The Malacca Gros-beak" and Mathurin Jacques Brisson's "Le Maia de la Chine". The English naturalist John Ray used the word "Maia" for a Cuban bird in 1768. Linnaeus specified the locality as East India. This was amended to Malacca in 1924. The white-headed munia is now placed in the genus Lonchura that was introduced by the English naturalist William Henry Sykes in 1832. It is treated as monotypic: no subspecies are recognised.

Description
Smallish (11 cm), white headed brown finch. Similar to the chestnut munia but paler brown and entire head and throat white. Young birds are brown on upperparts with underparts and face buff. Iris-brown; bill-grey; feet-pale blue.  Voice: high-pitched 'pee-pee'.

Distribution and status
Malay peninsula, Sumatra, Java, Bali and Celebes. In Java and Bali this is a fairly common and widespread bird up to 1500 m.

Behaviour
It frequents marshes and reedbeds. Like other munias form large flocks during rice harvest but spread out in pairs during breeding season. General behaviour similar to other munias.

Feeding
Rice and Grass seeds.

Breeding
Four to five, occasionally six, white eggs are laid in a typical munia ball-shaped grass nest. Breeding is recorded in West Java for February.

References

BirdLife Species Factsheet

Lonchura
Birds of Borneo
Birds of the Malay Peninsula
Birds of Sumatra
Birds of Vietnam
Birds described in 1766
Taxa named by Carl Linnaeus